Robert Kessler (born 5 April 1973 in Neuwied, West Germany) is a former motorcycle speedway rider, from Germany.

Career
Kessler represented Germany at the Speedway World Team Cup. He was the German under-21 champion in 1992 and 1993.

He started his British league career with Sheffield Tigers in 1994. He spent five seasons with them from 1994 to 2001, although in between he had a season with King's Lynn Stars. He then moved to Hull Vikings in 2002 before switching to Stoke Potters in 2003.

His last season before retirement was in Britain, riding with the Rye House Rockets in 2010.

Personal life
A mechanical engineer by trade, Robbie founded ROK Racing a speedway motor-cycle building and engine tuning business, in 2010.

References 

1973 births
Living people
German speedway riders
Coventry Bees riders
Hull Vikings riders
Ipswich Witches riders
King's Lynn Stars riders
Mildenhall Fen Tigers riders
Redcar Bears riders
Rye House Rockets riders
Sheffield Tigers riders
Stoke Potters riders
People from Neuwied
Sportspeople from Rhineland-Palatinate